Raymond "Masai" Hewitt (January 1, 1941 – March 2, 1988) was an American civil rights activist and one of the leaders of the Black Panther Party.

Black Panther
Previous to joining the Black Panther Party, Hewitt worked as a school teacher and had been a Marxist activist, working with a group called United Front, a socialist organization which also taught self-defence to its members in the form of karate. Hewitt joined the Black Panther Party in 1967 and was given the title of Minister of Education. Hewitt was considered by the Panthers to have a strong understanding of political and Marxist theory.

Target of COINTELPRO
Hewitt was a target of COINTELPRO, a controversial FBI scheme intended to undermine radical organizations, which FBI Director J. Edgar Hoover had specifically directed to destroy the Black Panther Party. In 1970, the FBI created the false story, from a San Francisco-based informant, that he impregnated married actress Jean Seberg. Seberg was a supporter of the Black Panther Party, giving them a number of donations, and in the course of her interactions with the Panthers had befriended Hewitt. The story was reported by gossip columnist Joyce Haber of the Los Angeles Times, and was also printed by Newsweek magazine. Seberg went into premature labor and, on August 23, 1970, gave birth to a  baby girl. The child died two days later. She held a funeral in her hometown with an open casket that allowed reporters to see the infant's white skin, which disproved the rumors.

Seberg and her husband later sued Newsweek for libel and defamation, asking for US$200,000 in damages. She contended she became so upset after reading the story, that she went into premature labor, which resulted in the death of her daughter. A Paris court ordered Newsweek to pay the couple US$10,800 in damages and ordered Newsweek to print the judgment in their publication, plus eight other newspapers.

Departure from the BPP
By January 1973, Hewitt had become critical of the ever-increasing domination of the Panthers by Huey Newton. In a meeting of the Party's Central Committee, Hewitt suggested that the Central Committee by that point served only to confirm Newton's decisions:

In return, Newton stripped Hewitt of his role as Minister of Education; within weeks Hewitt had left the party.

Hewitt remained an activist for the rest of his life. He worked with the Southern Christian Leadership Conference's Southern Africa Resource Center, the International Human Rights Coalition of Los Angeles, and the Philippine Support Committee.

Personal life
Hewitt fathered one daughter with fellow Black Panther leader Elaine Brown. Hewitt was married to activist Ester Soriano, with whom he had three sons.

Death
On March 2, 1988, Hewitt suffered a heart attack while he watched the Grammy Awards on television with his wife. He was taken to Midway Hospital where he died a short time later.

References

1941 births
1988 deaths
African-American activists
Activists for African-American civil rights
African-American communists
African-American Marxists
Black Panther Party
COINTELPRO targets
Members of the Black Panther Party